Jessica Dubé (born October 29, 1987) is a Canadian former competitive figure skater who is best known for her pairs career with Bryce Davison. They are the 2008 World bronze medallists, the 2009 Four Continents silver medallists, and three-time Canadian national champions (2007, 2009, 2010). They represented Canada at the 2006 and 2010 Winter Olympics. With later partner Sébastien Wolfe, Dubé is the 2012 Canadian national silver medallist.

Career

Early years 
Jessica Dubé began skating at age four. She eventually took up pair skating and competed for a few seasons with Samuel Tetrault. During the 2002–03 season, they won silver at the Junior Grand Prix Final and also became Canadian junior champions.

Partnership with Davison 
Dubé teamed up with Bryce Davison in July 2003. The two had a successful junior career before moving up to the senior level in 2005–06. They placed 10th at the 2006 Winter Olympic Games and 7th at the World Championships that same season. She has also competed in singles skating. Her highest finish in the senior ladies' event at the Canadian Championships was 6th in 2008; internationally, she was a medallist at two junior Grand Prix events.

In the summer of 2006, Dubé suffered an injury in practice and was removed from the ice on a backboard; she had knee surgery in September. They trained both short and long programs for nationals, while Jessica also trained a short program for the singles event. They won their first national crown in Nova Scotia at the 2007 Canadian Championships. After an on-ice accident at the 2007 Four Continents (see below), they made a comeback a month later at the World Championships, where they again finished seventh.

Dube and Davison had a breakthrough season in 2007–08. They won their first Grand Prix medals, including a gold at 2007 Skate America. They lost the national title to Anabelle Langlois and Cody Hay at the 2008 Canadian Championships, but two months later at the World Championships, they won the bronze medal after finishing second in the long program; they set personal best scores in each segment of the event and overall.

The next two seasons did not prove as successful, and while they regained and then defended their national title, the pair were unable to repeat their success at the World Championships. Their top placement during this time was a second-place finish at the 2009 Four Continents Championships. Dube and Davison were part of Team Canada at the inaugural World Team Trophy in April 2009. In the 2009–10 Olympic season, they medalled at both Grand Prix events but did not qualify for the Grand Prix final. They were sixth at the Olympics and at Worlds.

Dubé and Davison withdrew from 2010 Skate Canada International after Davison suffered a knee injury. Davison underwent season-ending surgery to reattach a broken piece of bone.

Dubé elected to compete as a singles skater in 2010–11. She qualified for Canadian Nationals, and competed in the ladies' event for the first time in three years, her last appearance being in 2008 when she finished 6th. Despite falling ill with a virus on the morning of the free skate, she skated to a 6th-place finish in 2011.

Dubé and Davison announced the end of their partnership on March 10, 2011. Dubé said she intended to continue as a singles skater but did not rule out returning to pair skating in the future.

Accidents 
On February 8, 2007, Dubé was struck in the face by the blade of Davison's skate during the free skate segment at the Four Continents Championships in Colorado Springs. The pair were on their third rotation of a side-by-side camel spin, in which one leg is horizontal during the spin, when they began to drift towards one another, causing her face and his skate blade to connect. She immediately fell to the ice and clutched at her face as blood pooled on the ice. Davison comforted her as the medical staff put her on a stretcher and took her to Memorial Hospital. She underwent surgery that night, receiving 83 stitches to repair a laceration on her left cheek and nose. Her eye was not affected and nothing was broken. Both skaters were later treated for post-traumatic stress disorder, but by March 2007 they had returned to competition together.
	
In April 2009, at the gala exhibition of the 2009 World Team Trophy in Tokyo, Dubé accidentally struck Davison on the head during a triple twist; he was unable to catch her and she crashed to the ice, hitting her head. Dubé and Davison were hospitalized as a precautionary measure, but neither was seriously injured.

Partnership with Wolfe 
On April 17, 2011, Dubé announced that she had teamed up with Sébastien Wolfe. The pair made their competitive debut at the Liberty Summer competition in July, winning the free skate. They were coached by Annie Barabe and also worked with John Zimmerman on pair elements. Dubé and Wolfe made their international debut together at the 2011 Nebelhorn Trophy, where they finished 6th. They competed at two Grand Prix events, 2011 Skate Canada International, where they finished 5th, and 2011 Trophee Eric Bompard, where they were 6th. Dubé and Wolfe won the silver medal at the 2012 Canadian Championships and were assigned to Four Continents and Worlds. At the 2012 Four Continents, they finished 8th.

In the 2012–2013 season, Dube and Wolfe were assigned two Grand Prix events, the 2012 Skate America and 2012 Rostelecom Cup, but withdrew from both. Dubé had an injury to her right foot which affected their training. After several months of consideration, Dubé and Wolfe announced on January 9, 2013 that they had both decided to retire from competition. Dubé has completed her initial National Coaching Certification Program (NCCP) and begun coaching alongside Yvan Desjardins and Michelle Godbout.

Personal life 
Dubé has an older sister, Veronique, who competed at the national level. Dubé lost part of a finger in a lawnmower accident at the age of four. 
Following her competitive retirement, Dubé moved to Montreal where she is a student at Concordia University.

Programs

With Wolfe

With Davison

Singles career

Competitive highlights

With Wolfe

With Davison

With Tetrault

Singles

References

External links

 
 
 
 

1987 births
Battle of the Blades participants
Canadian female pair skaters
Canadian female single skaters
Figure skaters at the 2006 Winter Olympics
French Quebecers
Living people
Olympic figure skaters of Canada
People from Varennes, Quebec
Sportspeople from Drummondville
Figure skaters at the 2010 Winter Olympics
World Figure Skating Championships medalists
Four Continents Figure Skating Championships medalists
World Junior Figure Skating Championships medalists
Sportspeople from Quebec
21st-century Canadian women